is Tōson Shimazaki's most famous historical novel. It was originally published in Chūō Kōron in 1929 as a serial work. Shinchosha later published the work in novel form, with the first part being released in January 1932 and the second part being released in November 1935. It started with the phrase "The entire Kisoji is in the mountains" (木曾路はすべて山の中である Kisoji wa subete yama no naka de aru). The Kisoji ran through Shimazaki's hometown in Gifu Prefecture, Japan.

Following a character modeled closely after Tōson's own father Shimazaki Masaki, the novel carries its story through the turbulent decades before and after the fall of the Tokugawa shogunate sparked by the arrival of Commodore Perry's ships in 1853. The protagonist Aoyama Hanzō, a devout follower of Hirata Atsutane's idealistic nativism but tied down by his duties as the head of a rural mountain village, observes the tide of events leading to the opening and Westernization of Japan.

In the years after the civil war of 1868, the Hirata movement achieves its initial goals and becomes superficially incorporated into the new bureaucracy, but deteriorates into political impotence and is gradually expelled by the progressive-minded leadership. Hanzō, fearing that Japan's native values and way of life will be discarded and forgotten by future generations enamored by things Western, is driven insane by despair and ultimately dies after being imprisoned by his own family.

In 1953, a film based on the novel was released. It was adapted by Kaneto Shindō and directed by Kōzaburō Yoshimura (吉村 公三郎 Yoshimura Kōzaburō). It was also later adapted into a play by Joseph Stein.

List of characters
Historical characters mentioned or appearing in the story include:

Shimazaki  Masaki (Aoyama Hanzō)
Tsunoda Tadayuki (Kureta Masaka)
 (Hachiya Kozō)
 (Miyagawa Kansai)
Kurimoto Jōun (Kitamura Zuiken)
Yamakuni Hyōbu
Takeda Kōunsai

Tokugawa Yoshikatsu
Matsudaira Yorinori
Itagaki Taisuke
Itō Hirobumi
Shimazu Hisamitsu
Charles Richardson
Makino Narisada
Engelbert Kaempfer

 (Iseya Kyūbei)
Sagara Sōzō
Yoshida Shōin
Saigō Takamori
Higashikuze Michitomi
Oguri Kozukenosuke
Katsu Kaishū
Yamaoka Tesshū
Townsend Harris
Léon Roches
Mermet de Cachon
Princess Kazu
Nakae Chōmin
Matthew C. Perry
Tokugawa Iemochi
Tokugawa Yoshinobu
Emperor Meiji
Emperor Kōmei
Maki Yasuomi

Tokugawa Nariaki
Etō Shinpei
Sanjō Sanetomi
Harry Parkes
William Keswick
Kanagaki Robun
Takano Chōei

Kusaka Genzui
Kirino Toshiaki

Matsudaira Katamori
Ii Naosuke
Gotō Shōjirō
Iwakura Tomomi
Motoori Norinaga
Hirata Atsutane
Hirata Kanetane
Hirata Nobutane
Robert B. Van Valkenburgh
Richard Boyle
Edmund Morel

Translation
Before the Dawn, transl. by William E. Naff, University of Hawaii Press, April 1987, 798 pages,

Original work
Yoakemae is now an open source text:
Part 1a, 1b, 2a, 2b

References

1935 novels
Novels by Tōson Shimazaki
Historical novels
Novels first published in serial form
Works originally published in Chūōkōron
Novels set in Gifu Prefecture
Boshin War
Shinbutsu bunri
Shinchosha books
Japanese novels adapted into films